Germiyan is a village in the Khizi Rayon of Azerbaijan.

References

External links

Populated places in Khizi District